Heatseeker is a combat flight simulator video game for the Wii, PlayStation 2, and PlayStation Portable game systems jointly developed by IR Gurus (now Transmission Games) and Codemasters.

Story
Players take on the role of an International Council pilot Mike "Downtown" Hudson, often accompanied by wingman Hank "Divot" Harrison. The game begins with a terrorist attack. The plot follows the International Council's attempt to thwart a dangerous dictator with an advanced nuclear cache named Bae Jung-Tae. Along the way, the player uses their flying and fighting skills to tackle a range enemies in the air, on land and at sea.

Gameplay
Heatseeker is an aerial combat game that pits players against a variety of computer-controlled airborne opponents. Players are equipped with modern military hardware and a choice of weapons. The game offers players access to 17 jets and 37 different weapons.

Missions take place over Korea, the Caribbean and Antarctica. Heatseeker has a display feature called ImpactCam, which allows the player to follow the progress of a missile once it is fired through to impact, from several camera angles. Environments are destructible, and players can blow up bridges, airports, docks, and military bases. The game offers players the choice between first and third person viewpoints.

Reception

The PlayStation 2 and Wii versions received "mixed" reviews, while the PSP version received "generally unfavorable reviews", according to the review aggregation website Metacritic.

References

External links
 

2007 video games
Shooter video games
Wii games
PlayStation 2 games
PlayStation Portable games
Video games developed in Australia
Codemasters games
Halfbrick Studios games
Video games developed in the United Kingdom
Transmission Games games
Single-player video games